Ali Naghi oglu Naghiyev (born 8 November 1958) is an Azerbaijani Colonel general, who serves as Chief of State Security Service of the Republic of Azerbaijan.

Life 
Naghiyev Ali Naghi oglu was born on 8 November 1958, in Babek District of the Nakhichevan Autonomous Soviet Socialist Republic (now the Nakhichevan Autonomous Republic).  In 1981, he graduated from the Azerbaijan Pedagogical Institute (now Azerbaijan State Pedagogical University).  He started working in 1975. In 1986, Ali Naghiyev graduated from the Higher Courses of the CSS of the USSR, and after that served on executive positions in the operational structures of the CSS of Azerbaijan SSR and the MNS of the Republic of Azerbaijan.

By the order of 16 March 2005, the President of the Republic of Azerbaijan appointed Ali Naghiyev to the position of Deputy Minister of National Security of the Republic of Azerbaijan.  By the order of 27 March 2006, the President of the Republic of Azerbaijan appointed Ali Naghiyev to major general. 

In 2011-2019, Ali Naghiyev was Deputy Chief of the General Anti-Corruption Directorate under the General Prosecutor of the Republic of Azerbaijan. By the order of 5 August 2014, the President of the Republic of Azerbaijan appointed Ali Naghiyev the special high rank of State Counselor of Justice of the 3-rd class.  By the order of 20 June 2019, the President of the Republic of Azerbaijan appointed Ali Naghiyev Chief of State Security Service of the Republic of Azerbaijan.  By the order of 27 June 2019, the President of the Republic of
Azerbaijan appointed Ali Naghiyev to lieutenant general.

Awards 
During his service in the security forces, he was awarded numerous state awards and other prizes.
 Medal “For military service” by the Decree of the President of the Republic of Azerbaijan No. 40 dated 24 December 1998;
 Awarded with the Order “Flag of Azerbaijan” by the Decree of the President of the Republic of Azerbaijan No. 680 of 27 March 2002, for high professionalism, courage, and bravery;
 Medal “For the Motherland” by the Order of the President of the Republic of Azerbaijan No. 140 dated 25 March 2004;
 Medal “For Heroism” by the Order of the President of the Republic of Azerbaijan No. 672 dated 16 March 2005;
 By the order of the President of the Republic of Azerbaijan No. 514 dated 28 September 2018, he was awarded the Order of “Merit to the Fatherland”, 3rd degree;
 By the order of the President of the Republic of Azerbaijan No. 1952 dated 27 March 2020 was awarded the Order of “For Merit to the Fatherland”, 1st degree.
 By the order of the President of the Republic of Azerbaijan dated 9 December 2020 was awarded the Zafar Order.

References

External links 

 Əli Nağıyev DTX rəisi oldu
 ƏLİ NAĞIYEV DTX RƏİSİ TƏYİN OLUNDU!

1958 births
Living people
People from Babek District
Azerbaijani generals
Recipients of the Azerbaijani Flag Order
Azerbaijan State Pedagogical University alumni
Azerbaijani military personnel of the 2020 Nagorno-Karabakh war